National Solar Conference and World Renewable Energy Forum 2012 is an academic/scientific conference combined with a solar industry trade exhibition, to be held at the Denver Convention Center in Colorado, May 13 to 19, 2012.

It's organized jointly by the American Solar Energy Society, the World Renewable Energy Network, the International Solar Energy Society, the Colorado Renewable Energy Society, and the National Renewable Energy Laboratory.

The Conference incorporates the 41st annual National Solar Energy Conference, the 37tn National Passive Solar Energy Conference, the 7th ASES Policy and Marketing Conference, and a Renewable Energy Products and Services Exhibition. The Exhibition will be open to the public on Friday, May 19.

Conference chair is Chuck Kutscher, Ph.D., a principal engineer at the National Renewable Energy Lab.

References

External links 
 National Solar Conference/World Renewable Energy Forum
 Call for papers
 World Renewable Energy Network
 American Solar Energy Society
 International Solar Energy Society
 Colorado Renewable Energy Society
 National Renewable Energy Laboratory

Energy conferences
2012 conferences
Renewable energy
2012 in Colorado
2012 in the environment